A jubilee is a particular anniversary of an event, usually denoting the  25th, 40th, 50th, 60th, and the 70th anniversary. The term is often now used to denote the celebrations associated with the reign of a monarch after a milestone number of years have passed.

Religious usage

The Jubilee ( yovel) year (every 50th year) and the Sabbatical year (every seventh year) are Biblical commandments concerning ownership of land and slaves. The laws concerning the Sabbatical year are still observed by many religious Jews in the State of Israel, while the Jubilee has not been observed for many centuries. According to the Hebrew Bible, every seventh year, farmers in the land of Israel are commanded to let their land lie fallow, and slaves were freed. The celebration of the Jubilee is the fiftieth year, that is, the year after seven Sabbatical cycles. 

In Roman Catholic tradition, a Jubilee is a year of remission of sins and also the punishment due to sin.

Terms for anniversaries

Silver jubilee, for a 25th anniversary.
Ruby jubilee, for a 40th anniversary.
Golden jubilee, for a 50th anniversary.
Diamond jubilee, for a 60th anniversary.
Sapphire jubilee, for a 65th anniversary.
Platinum jubilee, for a 70th anniversary.

These are also used as general terms in the modern world.

See also
 Wedding anniversary – Celebration and gifts
 Hierarchy of precious substances

References

External links

A history of jubilees – The British Royal Family

Anniversaries